Hasanabad-e Ab Konar (also Romanized as Ḩasanābād-e Āb Konār; also known as Ḩasanābād) is a village in Balyan Rural District, in the Central District of Kazerun County, Fars Province, Iran. At the 2006 census, its population was 139, in 31 families.

References 

Populated places in Kazerun County